"Buffalo Gals" is a 1982 hip hop single released by Malcolm McLaren and the World's Famous Supreme Team,  from McLaren's 1983 album Duck Rock. The song is composed of extensive scratching with calls from square dancing. The music video prominently features the Rock Steady Crew.

History
While in New York City looking for a support act for Bow Wow Wow, McLaren got the idea for the song when he went to an outdoor concert (known as a "Block Party") by Afrika Bambaataa and Universal Zulu Nation. This is where he was exposed to hip-hop for the first time and discovered the scratching technique he would use on this song. Most of the scratching and the beat of the song were composed by Trevor Horn.

Charisma Records were not initially keen on releasing the song, but relented after a strong positive response to the first broadcast of the track by DJ Kid Jensen.

Recording

In the liner notes for Duck Rock, McLaren wrote that this track was "recorded with the World's Famous Supreme Team and Zulu singers backing them up with the words 'she's looking like a hobo.' The performance by the Supreme Team may require some explaining, but suffice to say they are DJs from New York City who have developed a technique using record players like instruments, replacing the power chord of the guitar with the needle of a gramophone, moving it manually backwards and forwards across the surface of a record. We call it scratching."

Trevor Horn recalled the recording: "By the time Malcolm McLaren arrived, I'd got a Fairlight ... By the time I did McLaren I'd bought an Oberheim sequencer and drum machine, a DMX and a DSX. I told the World's Famous Supreme Team to tell me their favourite drum beat. It took a couple of hours for them to actually communicate it to me, but once I'd got it, that was 'Buffalo Girls': 'du du — cha — du du — cha'. That was done on this DMX and DSX and they just scratched on top of that."

Re-release
McLaren and the World's Famous Supreme Team released a record based on the song that includes several remixes, released on September 25, 1998 by Virgin Records, entitled "Buffalo Gals Back to Skool". The record features artists such as KRS-One, Rakim, Henri Scars Struck and Stephen Hague, among others.

Samples and covers

The World's Famous Supreme Team sampled the line "First Buffalo Gal go 'round the outside" in their 1984 song "Hey DJ". Malcolm McLaren was not involved in creating the song; however, he received credits on the A-side. The line is also referenced by Eminem at the beginning of his 2002 single "Without Me", with the lyric being changed to "Two trailer park girls go 'round the outside".

Neneh Cherry's 1989 hit "Buffalo Stance" is loosely based on "Buffalo Gals", and samples the song. The song is also sampled in the Sublime single "Doin' Time and in "I Wish" by Skee-Lo.

Hip hip trio The Beatnuts sampled the song in their debut album Intoxicated Demons: The EP. The sample is used in the opening song, "World's Famous Intro", which is a nod to The World's Famous Supreme Team. The song was again featured on their 2005 Greatest Hits album, Classic Nuts, Vol. 1.

"Buffalo Gals" was also sampled on the Public Enemy album Fear of a Black Planet, in a track called "Brothers Gonna Work It Out".

Elements from Malcolm McLaren's recording are sampled in the song "Powerless (Say What You Want)" by Nelly Furtado. It was also sampled in Kylie Minogue's KylieFever2002 world tour performance of "Cowboy Style". "Double Dutch" was also sampled in this performance.

Charts

References

External links

 

1982 debut singles
Malcolm McLaren songs
British hip hop songs
1982 songs
Charisma Records singles
Songs written by Trevor Horn
Songs written by Anne Dudley
Atco Records singles
Island Records singles
Atlantic Records singles
Songs written by Malcolm McLaren